Megachile odontostoma is a species of bee in the family Megachilidae.

References

odontostoma
Insects described in 1924